Erimyzon is a genus of suckers native to North America.  There are currently four recognized species in this genus.

Species
 Erimyzon claviformis (Girard, 1856) (Western creek chubsucker)
 Erimyzon oblongus (Mitchill, 1814) (Creek chubsucker)
 Erimyzon sucetta (Lacépède, 1803) (Lake chubsucker)
 Erimyzon tenuis (Agassiz, 1855) (Sharpfin chubsucker)

References
 

Taxa named by David Starr Jordan

Biology

Chubsuckers live in creeks, lakes, ponds, rivers, and streams. They are commonly found near thick vegetation.

Diet

Chubsucker species mainly consume aquatic insect larva. They can be seen "sucking" on the substrate of their watershed searching for a meal.

Catostomidae
Fish of North America